The Libyan Premier League is the men's top professional football division of the Libyan football league system. Administered by the Competition Organizing Committee in the Libyan Football Federation (Arabic: لجنة تنظيم المسابقات بالإتحاد الليبي لكرة القدم), Libyan Premier League is contested by 24 teams divided into two groups of 12, with the two lowest-placed teams of each group relegated to the First Division.

51 have competed in Libyan Premier League since its inception. Ten teams have been crowned champions, with Al-Ittihad winning the title a record 18 times and Al-Ahly Tripoli 12 times being the dominating clubs of the tournament. Al-Ahly Tripoli won the inaugural Premier League in 1963. Al-Ahly Tripoli and Al-Ahly Benghazi dominated the championship in the 1970s, winning four titles and two titles respectively throughout the decade. Al-Ittihad dominated the League through the 2000s, winning 8 titles.

The league has been ranked by the IFFHS as the 56th highest in the world for 2009, making it the sixth-highest ranked league in the Arab world, after the Saudi Professional League (32nd), the Egyptian Premier League (34th), the Algerian Ligue Professionnelle 1 (48th), the Tunisian Ligue Professionnelle 1 (54th) and the Sudan Premier League (55th), and the eighth highest in Africa, after the Nigerian Professional Football League (30th), Egyptian Premier League, the Girabola in Angola (42nd), Algerian Ligue Professionnelle 1, Zambia Super League (53rd), Tunisian Ligue Professionnelle 1 and Sudan Premier League.

History
The Libyan Premier League was founded in 1963. Prior to that, there were three Provincial Championships, one each for the Eastern, Western and Southern provinces. The first league season at national level was the 1963-64 season, in which participated the Western Province champion Al Ahly (Tripoli), the Eastern Province champion Al Ahly (Benghazi) and the Southern Province champion Hilal Sabha. After the withdrawal of Hilal Sabha due to lack of resources, the league was limited to just two teams. Al Ahly (Tripoli) defeated Al Ahly (Benghazi) 2-0 over two matches (1-0 home and away) to become the first Libyan Premier League champions.

Winners 
Al Ittihad are the most successful Libyan club, having won 18 titles, including 6 straight titles (from 2004–05 to 2009–10. Their arch rivals Al Ahly (Tripoli) have won it 12 times.

The last team to win the title from outside the capital was al- Naser fc, who won the league in the 2018 season. The Big Two (Al Ahly (Tripoli) & Al Ittihad) have won 30 of the 47 titles that have been contested since 1964.

Champions by season
Winners are:

Performance by club

Titles by city

2022–23 Clubs 

Group 1

Group 2

Top scorers by season
Top scorers are:

Regulations 
The rules can be found on the official LFF website.

References

External links
 League at FIFA
 Libyan Premier League - Hailoosport.com (Arabic)
 Libyan Premier League - Hailoosport.com

 
Libya